Riverside Secondary School (RSS) is a co-educational government secondary school located in Woodlands, Singapore. Students of the school are referred to as "Riversidians".

History
On 16 December 1996, Lu Kheng Lui became the second Principal and in April 1997, Hoon Tien Ghun, the first Vice-Principal. Lu wrote the school's first vision statement and led the school in piloting the home-grown Interdisciplinary Project Work and the IT Master Plan Phase 2A. In December 2000, Stella Tan-Wee Bee Lian became the school's principal.

In 2005, the school signed a Memorandum of Understanding with Nan Huan Middle School in Suzhou and staff and students have undertaken school exchange programmes since then.

From end 2002 to end 2004, Riverside underwent upgrading works under the Programme for Rebuilding and Improving Existing Schools. A new school crest and a new school uniform were designed.

In December 2005, Serene Pang became principal and oversaw a partnership with the polytechnics and an overseas school in Chennai.

In December 2006 the Head of English Department, Hilda Thong, was appointed Vice-Principal. In 2006 the school was awarded the Development Award in Character Development and Outstanding Development Award in National Education.

On 15 May 2007, Riverside welcomed its fifth Principal, Sng Siew Hong. In October 2007, the school was awarded the Lee Kuan Yew National Education Award.

On 16 December 2013, Riverside welcomed its sixth Principal, Tan Kong Yin Yee. In December 2015, Shanti Devi, became the seventh principal.

In December 2020, Tham Yoke Chun became the eighth principal.

Notable alumni 
 Bonnie Loo, singer and actress

References

External links 
 

Secondary schools in Singapore
Educational institutions established in 1987
Woodlands, Singapore
1987 establishments in Singapore